Artabasdos or Artavasdos ( or , from Armenian: Արտավազդ, Artavazd, Ardavazt), Latinized as Artabasdus, was a Byzantine general of Armenian descent who seized the throne from June 741 or 742 until November 743, in usurpation of the reign of  Constantine V.

Rise to power 
In about 713, Emperor Anastasius II appointed Artabasdos as governor (stratēgos) of the Armeniac theme (Θέμα Άρμενιάκων, Thema Armeniakōn), the successor of the Army of Armenia, which occupied the old areas of the Pontus, Armenia Minor, and northern Cappadocia, with its capital at Amasea. After Anastasius' fall, Artabasdos made an agreement with his colleague Leo, the governor of the Anatolic theme, to overthrow the new Emperor Theodosius III.  This agreement was sealed with the engagement of Leo's daughter Anna to Artabasdos, and the marriage took place after Leo III ascended the throne in March 717.

Artabasdos was awarded the rank of kouropalates ("master of the palace") and became commander (count, komēs) of the Opsikion theme, while retaining control of his original command.  In June 741 or 742, after the accession of Leo's son Constantine V to the throne, Artabasdos resolved to seize the throne and attacked his brother-in-law while the latter was traversing Asia Minor to fight the Arabs on the eastern frontier.  While Constantine fled to Amorion, Artabasdus seized Constantinople amid popular support and was crowned emperor.

Reign and downfall 
While it seems Artabasdos abandoned his predecessor's religious policy of Iconoclasm and restored Orthodoxy with some support, there is actually little support from contemporary sources. Soon after his accession, Artabasdus crowned his wife Anna as augusta and his son Nikephoros as co-emperor, while putting his other son Niketas in charge of the Armeniac theme.  But while Artabasdus could rely also on the support of the themes of Thrace and Opsikion, Constantine secured for himself the support of the Anatolic and Thracesian themes.

The inevitable clash came in May 743, when Artabasdus led the offensive against Constantine but was defeated.  Later the same year Constantine defeated Niketas, and on 2 November 743 Artabasdus' reign came to an end as Constantine V entered Constantinople. Artabasdus, accompanied by his close associate Baktangios fled to the castle of Pouzanes in Opsikion (Asia Minor), where they were apprehended and brought to Constantinople. Artabasdos and his sons were publicly blinded and relegated to the monastery of Chora on the outskirts of Constantinople. The date of his death is unknown.

Family
By his wife Anna, the daughter of Emperor Leo III, Artabasdos had nine children, including:
 Nikephoros, made co-emperor by his father.
 Niketas, who was strategos of the Armeniac theme from 742 to 743.

See also

 List of Byzantine emperors

Bibliography
Notes

References
  - Total pages: 226

Further reading
 Evangelos Venetis 

Isaurian dynasty
743 deaths
8th-century Byzantine emperors
Byzantine Iconoclasm
Byzantine people of Armenian descent
Armenian Byzantine emperors
Eastern Orthodox monks
Year of birth unknown
8th-century Armenian people
Governors of the Armeniac Theme
Leo III the Isaurian
Kouropalatai